The Trafalgar Tavern is a Grade II listed public house at Park Row, Greenwich, London, situated on the south bank of the River Thames, east of and adjacent to the Old Royal Naval College.

History

The Trafalgar Tavern, designed by architect Joseph Kay, opened in 1837, having been built on the site of 'The Old George Tavern'.

It was familiar to novelist Charles Dickens, who set the wedding breakfast in Our Mutual Friend there. It also became well-known as the venue for political whitebait dinners for the Liberal party in Victorian times, the last being held in 1883.

In 1915, the Tavern closed, and served as a home for aged seamen during World War I, later becoming a working men’s club between the wars. It reopened as a pub in 1965, and in 1996 was voted the Evening Standard Pub of the year.

See also
 List of pubs in London

References

Pubs in the Royal Borough of Greenwich
Grade II listed pubs in London
Commercial buildings completed in 1830
19th-century architecture in the United Kingdom
1830 establishments in England
Buildings and structures in the Royal Borough of Greenwich
Grade II listed buildings in the Royal Borough of Greenwich